The 12th annual 2008 Webby Awards were held on June 10, 2008 and emceed by SNL head writer Seth Meyers and help at Cipriani, a massive banquet hall in Manhattan's financial district. The Webby Film and Video Awards were held on June 9 at Skirball Center for the Performing Arts and were hosted by Judah Friedlander. The awards were judged by the International Academy of Digital Arts and Sciences, and winners were selected from over 10,000 entries. Lorne Michaels was honored with a lifetime achievement award.

Nominees and winners

(from http://www.webbyawards.com/winners/2008)

References
Winners and nominees are generally named according to the organization or website winning the award, although the recipient is, technically, the web design firm or internal department that created the winning site and in the case of corporate websites, the designer's client.  Web links are provided for informational purposes, both in the most recently available archive.org version before the awards ceremony and, where available, the current website.  Many older websites no longer exist, are redirected, or have been substantially redesigned.

External links
Official website

2008
2008 awards in the United States
2008 in New York City
June 2008 events in the United States
2008 in Internet culture